The Samar cobra (Naja samarensis) also called Peters' cobra, southern Philippine cobra or Visayan cobra, is a highly venomous species of spitting cobra native to the Visayas and Mindanao island groups of the Philippines.

Description
The Samar cobra is a species of spitting cobra that can grow up to 1.4 meters in length.  Their coloring varies from a black and yellow to green.

Scalation
There are 17-25 scale rows around the hood, 17-19 ahead of mid-body; 161-184 ventrals, 41-52 subcaudals, basal pairs sometimes undivided.

Reproduction
The Samar cobra, or southeastern Philippines cobra, is oviparous, laying clutches of up to eight eggs.

Distribution and habitat
The Samar cobra is endemic to the southern Philippines.  Specifically, the Visayas and Mindanao island groups.

Habitat can vary widely from mountainous jungle to tropical plains.  They can live close to human settlements.

The Samar cobra typically lives at an elevation of 0 - 1,000 m (0 - 3,280 feet) asl.

Behavior and diet
Like the Philippine cobra (Naja philippinensis), the Samar cobra feeds mostly on small rodents such as rats and mice.  They will also prey upon frogs and smaller reptiles.  Since their main food source is attracted to rice paddies and human settlements, this species often comes into conflict with people.

Venom
A proteomic study revealed a unique venom phenotype of the Samar cobra, which represents the easternmost dispersal of Naja cobra species. Like other Naja spp., Three-finger toxins (3FTx) dominate the venom proteome. 3FTx constituted 90% of the total venom proteins, recording by far the highest 3FTx abundance in snake venom. Other proteins in the venom comprised snake venom metalloproteinases (SVMP, 4.17%) and phospholipases A2 (PLA2 3.76%). The rest of minor toxins collectively accounted for <2% of total venom proteins; these were toxin families of cysteine-rich secretory protein (CRiSP, 1.06%), L-amino acid oxidase (LAAO, 0.26%), venom nerve growth factor (vNGF, 0.13%) and vespryn (VES, 0.13%). The crude venom of N. samarensis has  of 0.2mg/kg via intravenous injection (IV). They are noted for their nervous behavior, and are quick to strike as well as to spray venom, which they generally aim towards the face and eyes. However, the cobra is more reluctant to spit venom than its northern relative, the Northern Philippines cobra. If venom gets in the eyes, it causes extreme pain and mechanical damage to the eyeball. If not properly flushed out, it can result in permanent blindness due to its tissue destroying properties.

References

Naja
Reptiles of the Philippines
Endemic fauna of the Philippines
Fauna of Samar
Fauna of Leyte
Fauna of Bohol
Fauna of Dinagat Islands
Fauna of Mindanao
Reptiles described in 1861